Rait Ärm (born 31 March 2000) is an Estonian road cyclist, who currently rides for UCI Continental team . He finished 3rd in the under-23 road race at the 2019 European Road Championships.

Major results
2019
 2nd Kalmar Grand Prix
 3rd  Road race, UEC European Under-23 Road Championships
 6th Puchar Ministra Obrony Narodowej
 6th Korona Kocich Gór
 9th Grand Prix Minsk
2020
 2nd Time trial, National Road Championships
 3rd Overall Baltic Chain Tour
1st  Young rider classification
1st Stage 2
 10th Umag Trophy
2021
 1st  Road race, National Under-23 Road Championships
 5th Time trial, National Road Championships
 10th Grote Prijs Jean-Pierre Monseré
2022
 1st  Overall Baltic Chain Tour
1st  Young rider classification
1st Stage 1
 1st Grand Prix de la Somme
 2nd Grand Prix de la ville de Pérenchies
 3rd Time trial, National Under-23 Road Championships

References

External links

2000 births
Living people
Estonian male cyclists
People from Saku Parish